Sajjad Akbar (born 1 March 1961) is a former Pakistani cricketer who played two One Day Internationals in 1990.

A middle-order batsman and off-spin bowler, he played first-class cricket in Pakistan from 1978–79 to 2000–01. In the 1989–90 season he took 104 wickets at an average of 22.38. Playing for the Pakistan National Shipping Corporation against Karachi in 1987–88, he took 9 for 59 and 6 for 63.

References

External links
 

1961 births
Living people
Pakistan One Day International cricketers
Pakistani cricketers
Lahore City A cricketers
Lahore City cricketers
Water and Power Development Authority cricketers
Lahore City Blues cricketers
Pakistan National Shipping Corporation cricketers
Sargodha cricketers
Faisalabad cricketers
Pakistan Starlets cricketers
Pakistani cricket coaches
Cricketers from Lahore